Baglar may refer to:

Bağlar (disambiguation)
Biglar (disambiguation)